Prikubansky District (Qoban rayon) is an administrative and a municipal district (raion), one of the ten in the Karachay-Cherkess Republic, Russia. It is located in the northeast of the republic. Its administrative center is the rural locality (a settlement) of Kavkazsky. As of the 2010 Census, the total population of the district was 29,343, with the population of Kavkazsky accounting for 10.3% of that number.

Administrative and municipal status
Within the framework of administrative divisions, Prikubansky District is one of the ten in the Karachay-Cherkess Republic and has administrative jurisdiction over one urban-type settlement (Udarny) and twenty-three rural localities. As a municipal division, the district is incorporated as Prikubansky Municipal District. The urban-type settlement of Udarny is incorporated into an urban settlement, while the twenty-three rural localities are incorporated into eleven rural settlements within the municipal district. The settlement of Kavkazsky serves as the administrative center of both the administrative and municipal district.

References

Notes

Sources

Districts of Karachay-Cherkessia
